The Stowarzyszenie Harcerstwa Katolickiego "Zawisza" Federacja Skautingu Europejskiego ("Zawisza" Association of Catholic Scouting) of the International Union of Guides and Scouts of Europe is a Polish Scouting organization, based on the Scouting of French Jesuit Jacques Sevin, and the activities of prewar Scoutmaster Stanisław Sedlaczek. Since 1995 "Zawisza" is a member of the International Union of Guides and Scouts of Europe. The organization has 3311 members as of 2014.

References

Non-aligned Scouting organizations
Scouting and Guiding in Poland
Youth organizations established in 1995
Catholic youth organizations
Child-related organisations in Poland